Berhait Santali is a census town in the  Barhait CD block in the Sahibganj subdivision of the Sahibganj district in the Indian state of Jharkhand.

Geography

Location

Overview
Rajmahal coalfield is shown in the map. The entire area is overwhelmingly rural with only small pockets of urbanisation.

Note: The full screen map is interesting. All places marked on the map are linked and you can easily move on to another page of your choice. Enlarge the map to see what else is there – one gets railway links, many more road links and so on.

Demographics
According to the 2011 Census of India, Berhait Santali had a total population of 9,753, of which 4,997 (51%) were males and 4,756 (49%) were females. Population in the age range 0–6 years was 1,979. The total number of literate persons in Berhait Santali was 4,168 (53.61% of the population over 6 years).

Infrastructure
According to the District Census Handbook 2011, Sahibganj, Berhait Santali covered an area of 3.66 km2. Among the civic amenities, it had 0.5 km roads with both open and closed drains, the protected water supply involved uncovered well, hand pump. It had 151 domestic electric connections, 18 road lighting points. Among the educational facilities it had 2 primary schools, 2 middle schools, the nearest secondary, senior secondary schools at Barharwa 20 km away, 1 non-formal education centre (Sarva Sikhsa Abhiyan). It had the branch offices of 1 nationalised bank, 1 private commercial bank, 1 agricultural credit society.

Civic administration

Police station
Barhait police station serves this block.

CD block HQ
Headquarters of Barhait CD block is at Barhait village.

Education
SSD High School is a Hindi-medium coeducational institution established in 1949. It has facilities for teaching from class IX to class XII.

Kasturba Gandhi Balika Vidyalaya is a Hindi-medium girls only institution established in 2008. It has facilities for teaching from class VI to class XII.

Government High School Barhait is a Hindi-medium coeducational institution established in 1986. It has facilities for teaching in classes IX and X.

UPG Government Adarsh High School Berhait is a Hindi-medium coeducational institution established in 1912. It has facilities for teaching from class I to class X.

References

Cities and towns in Sahibganj district